Frank Bridge (26 February 187910 January 1941) was an English composer, violist and conductor.

Life

Bridge was born in Brighton, the ninth child of William Henry Bridge (1845-1928), a violin teacher and variety theatre conductor, formerly a master lithographic printer from a family of cordwainers, and his second wife, Elizabeth (née Warbrick; 1849-1899). His father "ruled the household with a rod of iron", and was insistent that his son spend regular long hours practising the violin; when Frank became sufficiently skilled, he would play with his father's pit bands, conducting in his absence, also arranging music and standing in for other instrumentalists. He studied at the Royal College of Music in London from 1899 to 1903 under Charles Villiers Stanford and others. He played in a number of string quartets, including second violin for the Grimson Quartet and viola for the English String Quartet (along with Marjorie Hayward). He also conducted, sometimes deputising for Henry Wood, before devoting himself to composition, receiving the patronage of Elizabeth Sprague Coolidge.

According to Benjamin Britten, Bridge had strong pacifist convictions, and he was deeply disturbed by the First World War, although the extent of his pacifism has been questioned in recent scholarship. During the war and immediately afterwards, Bridge wrote a number of pastoral and elegiac pieces that appear to search for spiritual consolation; principal among these are the Lament for strings, Summer for orchestra, A Prayer for chorus and orchestra, and a series of pastoral piano works. The Lament (for Catherine, aged 9 "Lusitania" 1915), for string orchestra, was written as a memorial to the sinking of the RMS Lusitania. The piece was premiered by the New Queen's Hall Orchestra, conducted by the composer, on 15 September, at the 1915 Proms, as part of a programme of "Popular Italian music", the rest of which was conducted by Henry Wood.

Bridge privately taught Benjamin Britten, who later championed his teacher's music and paid homage to him in the Variations on a Theme of Frank Bridge (1937), based on a theme from the second of Bridge's Three Idylls for String Quartet (1906). However, Bridge was not widely active as a teacher of composition, and his teaching style was unconventional – he appears to have focused on aesthetic issues, idiomatic writing, and clarity, rather than exhaustive technical training. Britten spoke very highly of his teaching, saying famously in 1963 that he still felt he hadn't "yet come up to the technical standards" that Bridge had set him. When Britten left for the United States with Peter Pears in 1939, Bridge handed Britten his Giussani viola and wished him 'bon voyage and bon retour'; Bridge died in 1941 without ever seeing Britten again.

Music

The earliest extant works are a series of substantial chamber works produced during his studies with C.V. Stanford at the Royal College of Music, along with a number of shorter works in various genres. Bridge completed his first major orchestral score, a Symphonic Poem (sometimes referred to as Mid of the Night), shortly after completing his studies. Brahms, Beethoven, Tchaikovsky, Franck, and Fauré are notable influences on this period.

The works completed in the following years suggest a search for a more mature and expressive idiom, culminating in the tumultuous First String Quartet and a series of Phantasies for chamber ensembles. His orchestral idiom developed more gradually, reaching a new maturity in The Sea of 1911, which was to become his most popular and successful orchestral work, receiving frequent performances at the Henry Wood Promenade Concerts during his lifetime.

In the period leading up to the First World War Bridge demonstrates an interest in more modernist tendencies, most notably in Dance Poem of 1913, which suggests the influence of Stravinsky and Debussy. During the war period, his exploration generally took more moderate forms – most often a pastoralism influenced by impressionism – although work such as the Two Poems for orchestra and several piano pieces display significant developments in his harmonic language, specifically towards a coloristic, non-functional use of harmony, and a preference for harmony derived from symmetrical scales such as whole tone and octatonic. During the same period Bridge completed two of his most successful chamber works, the Second String Quartet and Cello Sonata.

Bridge's idiom in the wartime works tends towards moderation, but after the war his language developed significantly, building on the experiments with impressionist harmony found in the wartime piano and orchestral music. Bridge's technical ambitions (documented in his correspondence) prompted him to attempt more complex, larger works, with more advanced harmonic elements and motivic working. Several of the resulting works have some expressive connections with the First World War, which appears to have influenced the mood of the Piano Sonata (1921-24, dedicated to his friend Ernest Farrar, killed in 1918) and certainly Oration (1929-30). 

During the 1920s Bridge pursued his ambitions to write more serious, substantial works. The Piano Sonata was the first major work to showcase his mature, post-tonal language on a substantial scale. This language is developed and used more effectively in the Third String Quartet, which sparked a series of major orchestral and chamber works, several of which rank among Bridge's greatest.

A final group of works followed in the 1930s and early 40s, including the Fourth String Quartet, the Phantasm for piano and orchestra, Oration for cello and orchestra, the Rebus Overture, and the first movement of a projected Symphony for strings.

Although he was not an organist, nor personally associated with music of the English Church, his short pieces for organ have been among the most performed of all his output.

Bridge was frustrated that his later works were largely ignored while his earlier "Edwardian" works continued to receive attention.

References

Bibliography

Further reading

External links
The Lied and Art Song Texts Page created and maintained by Emily Ezust. Original texts of the songs of Bridge translated in various languages.

Barnett, Rob. "Frank Bridge (1879–1941): Composer, Courageous Revolutionary and Pacifist". MusicWeb International (Accessed 8 November 2012). 
Frank Bridge pages Includes catalogue of works, selective discography, biography
Frank Bridge sound-bites and discussion of several of his chamber music works
 Supplements the above list of major works.
'Britten and Bridge', lecture and performance investigating the relation between the two composers, Gresham College, 5 February 2008 (announcement only: no longer available for download as text, audio or video file).
Frank Bridge: A Life in Brief by Trevor Bray Biography and complete list of works
Frank Bridge at bach-cantatas.com, with a selection of images of Bridge

1879 births
1941 deaths
19th-century classical composers
19th-century conductors (music)
19th-century English musicians
20th-century classical composers
20th-century British conductors (music)
20th-century English musicians
20th-century British male musicians
Alumni of the Royal College of Music
Benjamin Britten
British music educators
English classical composers
English classical violists
English conductors (music)
British male conductors (music)
English male classical composers
English pacifists
English Romantic composers
People from Brighton
Pupils of Charles Villiers Stanford